Chen Zhi (Chinese: 陳致; pinyin: Chén Zhì; born 1964) is a Chinese scholar and researcher in classical Chinese Studies, the Provost of Beijing Normal University-Hong Kong Baptist University United International College (UIC) and Director of the Jao Tsung-I Academy of Sinology (JAS) at Hong Kong Baptist University.

Life and career
Chen was born in 1964 in Beijing. In 1981, he was admitted to Peking University with a major in History. After graduation, he furthered his study and received his M.Phil. in Chinese Literature from Nanjing University in 1988 and Ph.D. in Chinese Studies from the University of Wisconsin–Madison in 1999.

His diverse interests in Chinese Studies range from classical studies, early Chinese culture and history, historiography, traditional Chinese poetry, excavated documents such as bronze inscriptions and bamboo and silk writings, and paleography to the intellectual history of the Ming and Qing dynasties.

In addition to his prolific scholarship in various fields of Chinese Studies, which has made him one of the leading figures in the studies of the Confucian classic Shijing (Book of songs) and bronze inscriptions, Chen is also an experienced university administrator. After serving as the Head of Department of Chinese Language and Literature at Hong Kong Baptist University (HKBU) between 2010 and 2013, he was appointed Acting Dean of the university's Faculty of Arts between 2015 and 2017. Chen also held the Associate Directorship of HKBU Institute of Creativity between 2011 and 2017 and Directorship of Mr. Simon Suen and Mrs. Mary Suen Sino-Humanitas Institute of the university between 2011 and 2014. From 2012 to 2014, he was appointed Acting Director of the Jao Tsung-I Academy of Sinology and has been its Director since 2014.

Bibliography

Research projects
 Chen Zhi, PI. “Preparation of a Manuscript for a Book Series on Important Bronze Inscriptions of the Western Zhou Dynasty (西周重器銘文滙釋叢書)” [RGC-GRF project no. 241613]. September 1, 2013–August 31, 2016.
 Chen Zhi, PI. “An Examination of the Evolution of Formulaic Phrases and Poetic Forms in the Excavated Zhou Texts and the Book of Odes (《詩經》與兩周出土文獻中之成語與韻文發展之考察)” [RGC-GRF project no. 240911]. September 1, 2011–August 31, 2014.
 Chen Zhi, PI. “Three Unheeded Facets of Early Chinese Literature” [FRG1/09-10/062]. May 1,
 Chen Zhi, PI. “The Lineages, Classical Studies, and Intellectual History under the Ming and Qing Examination System (明清科舉制度下的家族、學術與思想)” September 1, 2008 – August 31, 2010.
 Chen Zhi, PI. “Chronology of the Works of the Qing Scholars on the Shi jing (清代學者《詩經》研究著述年表)” [RGC-GRF project no. 240707 ]. 2007–2008.

Professional qualifications/Membership
 Chen Zhi and Dirk Meyer, eds. The Jao Tsung-I Library of Sinology (Book Series). De Gruyter, 2018- 
Volume 1 –David S. Nivison. The Nivison Annals: Selected Works of David S. Nivison on Early Chinese Chronology, Astronomy, and Historiography. Edited by Adam C. Schwartz. Volume 2 – Zhang Hanmo. Authorship and Text-Making in Early China. 陳致、麥笛主編：《饒宗頤國學院漢學叢書》，得古意特出版社，2018。叢書第一種——倪德衛著，史亞當編：《倪德衛早期中國自選集》。叢書第二種——張瀚墨著：《早期中國作者模式及文獻形成》。

 Chen Zhi, Chief Editor. Bulletin of the Jao Tsung-I Academy of Sinology (BJAS) (饒宗頤國學院院刊). Volumes 1–5. Hong Kong: Chung Hwa Book Company (Hong Kong) Limited, 2014–2018.
 Chen Zhi, Associate Editor and one of the two founding editors. Journal of Early Chinese Philosophers (諸子學刊). Volumes 1–11. Shanghai: Shanghai Guji Publishing House, 2007–2015.
 Zhu Yuanqing 朱淵清 and Chen Zhi, eds. Book Series on Early China by Contemporary Sinologists (早期中國研究叢書). Shanghai: Shanghai Guji Publishing House, 2006–present. (Over 20 books, translated from English and Japanese into Chinese, have been published thus far by world-leading scholars in the field of early China from US, Europe, Japan, Canada and Australia.)
 Local Convener of Chinese Language and Literature. Panel of Humanities, Hong Kong RAE 2014. 2013–2014.
 Fellow. Hong Kong Academy of the Humanities. 2014–present.

Books
 Chen Zhi. The Legacy of Odes, Documents, Ritual Music: A Self-Selected Anthology of Chen Zhi (詩書禮樂中的傳統：陳致自選集). Shanghai: Shanghai Renmin Publishing House, 2012. Pp. 422.
 Chen Zhi. Interview with Yu Ying-shih (余英時訪談錄). Beijing: Zhonghua Shuju, 2012. Pp. 224; Hong Kong: Chung Hwa Book Company (Hong Kong) Limited, 2012. Pp. 244; Taipei: Linking Publishing (Lien-ching), 2012. Pp. 328.
 Chen Zhi, ed. Selected Papers on Early China by Contemporary Sinologists (當代西方漢學研究集萃．上古史卷). Shanghai: Shanghai Guji Publishing House, 2012. Pp. 422.
 Chen Zhi. From Ritualization to Secularization: The Shaping of the Book of Songs (從禮儀化到世俗化：《詩經》的形成). Sankt Augustin, Germany: Monumenta Serica Institute, 2007. Pp. 380. (Translated into Chinese by Wu Yangxiang 吳仰湘, Hsu King Chiu 許景昭, and Wong Tsz Yung 黃梓勇. Shanghai: Shanghai Guji Publishing House. Pp. 363.)
 Chen Zhi. Chief Editor. A Dictionary of the Literary Allusions in Chinese Classical Poetry (中國古代詩詞典故辭典). Beijing: Yanshan Publishing House, 1991. Pp. 820.

Translations
 Chen Zhi and William H. Nienhauser, Jr., trans. “Hereditary House of T’ai-po of Wu” (Chinese-English) with comprehensive annotations. In The Grand Scribe’s Records, vol. V.1: The Hereditary Houses of Pre-Han China, Part I, edited by William H. Nienhauser Jr., 1–30. Bloomington: Indiana University Press, 2006.
 Chen Zhi et al., trans. Making America: The Society and Culture of the United States (美國特性探索：社會與文化). Beijing: China Social Sciences Publishing House, 1992. (Translated the “Preface,” “Introduction,” “From Immigration to Acculturation” by Arthur Mann, “Civil Disobedience in American Political Thought” by John P. Diggins, and “American Philosophy” by Moray Murphey from English into Chinese.)
 Chen Zhi et al., trans. Lectures on Systems Philosophy (系統哲學講演集) by Ervin Laszlo. Beijing: China Social Sciences Publishing House, 1991. (Translated “Cybernetics in an Evolving Social System toward an Evolutionary Philosophy,”   “Ψ-universe: the Farther Horizon,” and “The Objective of Mankind” from English to Chinese.)

Articles
 Chen Zhi and Nicholas M. Williams. “The Books of Songs: Form and Structure.” In The Homeric Epics and the Chinese Book of Songs: Foundational Texts Compared, edited by Fritz-Heiner Mutschler, 255–282. Newcastle upon Tyne, U.K.: Cambridge Scholars Publishing, 2018.
 Chen Zhi. “New Perspectives on the Study of Shijing.” New Perspectives on Chinese Culture 2015, no.3: 27–38.
 Chen Zhi. “‘Xiaoyao’ and ‘shuchi’: Some Special Uses of Alliterative and Rhyming Binomes in Transmitted and Excavated Documents.” Jianbo yanjiu (Study of bamboo and silk) 2015, nos.1–2: 1–14.
 Chen Zhi. “On the Red Silk Pendant and the Line of ‘bijiaofeishu’ in ‘Caishu’ Poem of the Shijing.” Guwenzi yanjiu (Paleography) 30 (2014): 514–521.
 Chen Zhi. “A New Interpretation of the Characters ‘yun,’ ‘yun,’ and ‘jun’ in Bronze Inscriptions.” Bulletin of the Jao Tsung-I Academy of Sinology 1 (2014): 135–160.
 Chen Zhi. “On the Idiomatic Expressions in the Book of Odes and Bronze Inscriptions (5): ‘buxian bucheng’, ‘bujian’ and ‘bujing.’” In Bamboo Strips, Silk Writing, Canons, and Early China, edited by Chen Zhi, 441–462. Shanghai: Shanghai Guji Publishing House, 2013.
 Chen Zhi. “‘Riju yuezhu’ and ‘rijiu yuejiang’: A Study of Early Tetra-syllabic Verse and Sacrificial Prayers in Early China.” In Poetic Legacy and Textual Studies in Ancient China, edited by Chen Zhi, 147–176. Beijing: Zhonghua Shuju, 2013.
 Chen Zhi. “An Interpretation of the Line of ‘wenwen qi youjia’ in the ‘Dance Accompanied by Strings of Duke of Zhou’ in Tsinghua Bamboo Strip Writings.” Chutu wenxian (Excavated documents) 3 (December, 2012): 41–47.
 Chen Zhi. “The Rite of ‘Drinking Ceremony’ and an Explanation of the Lost Poem as Seen in Tsinghua Bamboo Strips.” Chutu wenxian (Excavated documents) 1 (2012): 6–30. English version presented at “International Symposium on Excavated Manuscripts and the Interpretation of the Book of Odes,” September 12–13, 2009. Department of East Asian Languages and Civilizations, University of Chicago. Pp. 23.
 Chen Zhi. “‘Buwu  bu’ao’ and ‘bukan bute’: Some New Interpretations of These Terms in the Book of Odes and Bronze Inscriptions.” Gudian wenxian yanjiu (Research papers on classical documents) 13 (June, 2010): 4–19.
 Chen Zhi. “On the Textual Variants of the Ode ‘King Wen’ in the Greater Elegantiae section of the Book of Odes and Some Formulaic Expressions in the Contemporary Bronze Inscriptions.” Zhongguo shixue (Chinese poetics) 14 (March, 2010): 44–65.
 Chen Zhi. “The Rime and Meter of the ‘Hymns of Zhou’ and Bronze Inscriptions and the Shaping of the Tetra-syllable Verse in Early China.” In Papers on Interdisciplinary Study of the Book of Odes, edited by Chen Zhi, 17–59. Shanghai: Guji Publishing House, (March, 2010).
 Chen Zhi. “A Reading of ‘Nuo’ (Mao 301) in Light of Bronze Inscriptions: Some English translations of the Book of Odes Revisited.” In Orthodox and Schools of Thought: Changes in Confucian Canon Studies, edited by Lin Ching-chang and Christian Soffel, 359–388. Taipei: Wan-chuan-lou, 2013. Extended version of an article published on Chinese Literature: Essays, Articles, Reviews (CLEAR) 30 (2008): 1–7.
 Chen Zhi. “The Dance of Wan and the Yong Performance: The Sacrificial Music Dance Suite of the Shang dynasty and Its Relations to the Three ‘Hymns’ in the Book of Odes.” Journal of Chinese Literature and History 4 (December, 2008): 35–64.
 Chen Zhi. “Traditional Inter-textual Scholarship on Bronze Inscriptions and Philological Study of the Book of Odes in Ancient China.” In A Multi-perspectives Approach to Chinese Classical Learning, edited by Lo Yuet Keung and Neo Peng Fu, 289–332. Taipei: Student Book Company Limited, October, 2008.
 Chen Zhi. “The Qing Scholarship on Textual Variants of the Book of Odes.” Journal of Oriental Studies 41, no.2 (August, 2008):1–56.
 Chen Zhi. “A Study of Early Chinese Philosophers and Civil Service Examination in late Ming.” Journal of Early Chinese Philosophers 1 (2007): 383–420.
 Chen Zhi. “The Examination Paper of Liu Xianzeng: a Study of the Schools of Han and Song in Mid- and Late Qing.” Journal of Studies of Traditional China 2 (2006): 405–426.
 Chen Zhi. “The Examination Papers of Liu Xianzeng and Liu Shicang: A Study of the Genealogy, Civil Service and Scholarship of the Liu’s Family of Yizheng of Jiangsu Province. ” Journal of Nanjing Xiaozhuang University 3 (2006): 66–78. Rpt. Renmin University of China’s Important Papers on Ming and Qing History 9 (2006).
 Chen Zhi. “Negotiating between the Ancient and Modern, the Han and the Song Schools: Wang Xianqian’s Study of the ‘Modern Text’ of the Shi Jing”. Journal of Hunan University (Social Sciences) 20, no.1 (2006): 31–43. Also appeared in Collected Papers on Classical Studies during the Qing Dynasty in Hunan Province, edited by Zhu Hanmin, 219–250. Changsha: Hunan University Press, 2005.
 Chen Zhi. “From Exclusive Xia to Inclusive Zhu-Xia: The Conceptualization of Chinese Identity in Early China.” Journal of the Royal Asiatic Society 14, no.3 (2004): 185–205.
 Chen Zhi. “Nan: The Southern Bells and Elegant Music.” Guoxue yanjiu (Studies in Sinology) 13 (2004): 1–39.
 Chen Zhi. “On Early Concepts of Yi (Barbarism) and Xia (Chineseness).” Zhuoguoshi yanjiu (Journal of Chinese historical studies, Institute of History, Chinese Academy of Social Sciences) 101 (2004): 3–22.
 Chen Zhi. “An Investigation of Some Historical Facts during the Shang and Zhou Transition from Wang Guowei’s ‘Beibo Ding Ba’ (Postscript to the Vessel of the Earl of North).” Taida lishi xuebao (Historical inquiry of the National Taiwan University) 31 (2003): 1–43.
 Chen Zhi. “An Etymological Inquiry into the Early Concept of the Filial Piety.” Sino-Humanitas 9 (2002): 229–252.
 Chen Zhi. “Magnificence and Elegance: An Ethno-musicological Study of the Formation and Transformation of the Ritual Music of the Zhou Dynasty .” Bulletin of Institute of Chinese Literature and Philosophy, Academia Sinica 19 (2001): 1–53.
 Chen Zhi. “A New Reading of ‘Yen-yen’ (Mao 28 of the Book of Songs).” T’oung Pao 85, nos.1–3 (1999): 1-28.
 Chen Zhi. “A Study of the Bird Cult of the Shang People.” Monumenta Serica 47 (1999): 127–147.
 Chen Zhi. “A Paleographic Analysis of ‘Nan’ and Its Significance in Interpreting the Rationale for the Divisions of the Sections of the Shih ching.” Bulletin of the Institute of Chinese Literature and Philosophy, Academia Sinica 12 (1998): 355–402.

Book reviews
 Review of Li Feng's Landscape and Power in Early China: The Crisis and Fall of the Western Zhou, 1045–771 BC (New York: Cambridge University Press, 2006. Pp. 405). Early China 33 (2011): 282–286.
 Review of Mark Csikszentmihalyi's Material Virtue: Ethics and the Body in Early China (Leiden: Brill, 2004. Pp.vi+402). Bulletin of Institute of Chinese Literature and Philosophy 34 (2009): 326–336.
 Review of Ralph D. Sawyer's Fire and Water: The Art of Incendiary and Aquatic Warfare in China (Boulder, Colo.: Westview Press, 2004. Pp. 445). Journal of the Royal Asiatic Society 15, no. 2 (2005): 253–255.

References

University of Wisconsin–Madison alumni
1964 births
Living people
Educators from Beijing
Peking University alumni
Nanjing University alumni
Historians from Beijing